A wheelwright is a person who builds or repairs wheels.

Wheelwright may also refer to:

Places
 Wheelwright, Kentucky, city in Floyd County, Kentucky, USA
 Wheelwright, Massachusetts, village in the Town of Hardwick, Worcester County, Massachusetts, USA
 Wheelwright, Santa Fe, city in General López Department, Santa Fe Province, Argentina

Other uses
 Wheelwright (surname)
 Piast the Wheelwright, legendary figure who founded the Piast dynasty of Poland
 Wheelwright Hall,  dormitory at Phillips Exeter Academy in Exeter, New Hampshire, USA

See also 
 Worshipful Company of Wheelwrights, one of the Livery Companies of the City of London, England
 Wheelwright Museum of the American Indian, Santa Fe, New Mexico, USA
 Wainwright (disambiguation)
 Cartwright (disambiguation)
 Wright (disambiguation)